Tandospirone (brand name Sediel) is an anxiolytic and antidepressant drug used in China and Japan, where it is marketed by Dainippon Sumitomo Pharma. It is a member of the azapirone class of drugs and is closely related to other azapirones like buspirone and gepirone.

Medical uses

Anxiety and depression
Tandospirone is most commonly used as a treatment for anxiety and depressive disorders, such as generalised anxiety disorder and dysthymia respectively. For both indications it usually takes a couple of weeks for therapeutic effects to begin to be seen, although at higher doses more rapid anxiolytic responses have been seen. It has also been used successfully as a treatment for bruxism.

Augmentation for depression
Tandospirone can be used as an effective augmentation, especially when coupled with fluoxetine or clomipramine.

Other uses

Tandospirone has been tried successfully as an adjunctive treatment for cognitive symptoms in schizophrenic individuals.

Side effects
Common adverse effects include:

 Dizziness
 Drowsiness
 Insomnia
 Headache
 Gastrointestinal disorders
 Dry mouth
 Negative influence on explicit memory function
Adverse effects with unknown frequency include:

 Hypotension (low blood pressure)
 Dysphoria
 Tachycardia
 Malaise
 Psychomotor impairment

It is not believed to be addictive but is known to produce mild withdrawal effects (e.g., anorexia) after abrupt discontinuation.

Pharmacology

Pharmacodynamics
Tandospirone acts as a potent and selective 5-HT1A receptor partial agonist, with a Ki affinity value of 27 ± 5 nM and approximately 55 to 85% intrinsic activity. It has relatively weak affinity for the 5-HT2A (1,300 ± 200), 5-HT2C (2,600 ± 60), α1-adrenergic (1,600 ± 80), α2-adrenergic (1,900 ± 400), D1 (41,000 ± 10,000), and D2 (1,700 ± 300) receptors, and is essentially inactive at the 5-HT1B, 5-HT1D, β-adrenergic, and muscarinic acetylcholine receptors, serotonin transporter, and benzodiazepine allosteric site of the GABAA receptor (all of which are > 100,000). There is evidence of tandospirone having low but significant antagonistic activity at the α2-adrenergic receptor through its active metabolite 1-(2-pyrimidinyl)piperazine (1-PP).

Society and culture

Name
Tandospirone has also been known as metanopirone.

Synthesis
The Noreximide [6319-06-8] precursor also has dual uses to make Taglutimide & Tripamide & Lurasidone.

The catalytic hydrogenation of cis-5-Norbornene-exo-2,3-dicarboxylic anhydride [129-64-6] (1) gives Norbornane-2exo,3exo-dicarboxylic Acid-anhydride [14166-28-0] (2). Reaction with aqueous ammonia leads to Exo-2,3-norbornanedicarboximide [14805-29-9] (3). Alkylation with 1,4-dibromobutane [110-52-1] (4) gives CID:10661911 (5). Alkylation of the remaining halogen with 2-(1-Piperazinyl)Pyrimidine [20980-22-7] (6) completed the synthesis of Tandospirone (7).

References 

5-HT1A agonists
Alpha-2 blockers
Aminopyrimidines
Antidepressants
Anxiolytics
Azapirones
Cyclopentanes
Imides
Piperazines